Lecithocera concinna is a moth in the family Lecithoceridae. It was described by Turner in 1919. It is found in Australia, where it has been recorded from Queensland.

The wingspan is about 12 mm. The forewings are pale ochreous-grey with the discal dots blackish, the first at one-fourth, the second before two-thirds and the plical obsolete. There is a terminal series of blackish dots. The hindwings are pale ochreous-grey.

References

Moths described in 1919
concinna